Shilou County is a county in the west of Shanxi province, China, bordering Shaanxi province across the Yellow River to the west. It is under the administration of Lüliang City.

Climate

References

External links
www.xzqh.org 

County-level divisions of Shanxi